(or ), a Latin sentence meaning "Who [is] like God?", is a literal translation of the name Michael (transliterated Micha'el or Mîkhā'ēl).

The sentence  is particularly associated with Archangel Michael. In art, St. Michael is often represented as an angelic warrior, fully armed with helmet, sword, and shield, as he overcomes Satan, sometimes represented as a dragon and sometimes as a man-like figure. The shield at times bears the inscription: , the translation of the archangel's name, but capable also of being seen as his rhetorical and scornful question to Satan.

The Scapular of St. Michael the Archangel also bears this phrase.

See also

 El (deity)
 Song of the Sea
 Michaelion
 Michaelmas
 Novena to Saint Michael
 Prayer to Saint Michael
 Saint Michael in the Catholic Church

References

External links

Angels in Christianity
Biblical phrases
Latin words and phrases
Michael (archangel)